The 1992–93 1. Slovenská národná hokejová liga season was the 24th and last season of the 1. Slovenská národná hokejová liga, the second level of ice hockey in Czechoslovakia alongside the 1. Česká národní hokejová liga. 12 teams participated in the league, and AC Nitra won the championship. The top six teams in the league were promoted to the Slovak Extraliga for the following season, while the bottom six teams joined the Slovak 1.Liga

Regular season

The game between AC Nitra and VTJ Topoľčany was stopped during the second period due to an explosion. The game was scheduled to be replayed, but it was eventually cancelled.

References

External links
 Season  on avlh.sweb.cz (PDF)

Czech
1st. Slovak National Hockey League seasons
2